Archibald William Campbell McDonald (25 December 1882 – 20 July 1932) was an Australian rules footballer who played for the Essendon Football Club in the Victorian Football League (VFL).

Family

Parents
The son of Patrick McDonald (1852–1928), and Margaret McDonald (1853–1928), née Figgins, Archibald William Campbell McDonald, one of five boys and three girls, was born on 25 December 1882 in Nagambie, Victoria.

Siblings
Two of his brothers, Edwin Patrick "Ted" McDonald (1875–1919), and Fenley John "Fen" McDonald (1891–1915) also played VFL football; Ted, with Essendon, and Fen with both Carlton and Melbourne.

Fen enlisted in the First AIF, and was killed in action during the landing at Anzac Cove, Gallipoli, in Turkey on 25 April 1915. Another brother, Stanley David McDonald (1888–1945), also served in the First AIF, enlisting on 20 May 1915, before the news of Fen's death had reached his family. 

Arch married Susan Lillian Patten (1884–1972) in 1910.

Football
Arch and Ted played together in their only game with the Essendon First XVIII: the last match of the season, against Fitzroy, at the East Melbourne Cricket Ground, on 9 September 1905.

Death
He died in Melbourne on 20 July 1932.

See also
 List of Australian rules football families

Notes

References 
 Maplestone, M., Flying Higher: History of the Essendon Football Club 1872–1996, Essendon Football Club, (Melbourne), 1996.

External links 
		

1882 births
1932 deaths
Australian rules footballers from Victoria (Australia)
Essendon Football Club players